Baldomero López (August 23, 1925 – September 15, 1950) was a first lieutenant in the United States Marine Corps during the Korean War.  He posthumously received the Medal of Honor for smothering a hand grenade with his own body during the Incheon Landing on September 15, 1950.

Early life and education
López was born on August 23, 1925, in Tampa, Florida, and grew up in the neighborhood of Ybor City. His father, also named Baldomero López, had immigrated to the United States from Asturias in the north of Spain as a young man. The younger Lopez attended Hillsborough High School, where he was an accomplished basketball player and a regimental commander in the school's Junior Reserve Officers' Training Corps program. He enlisted in the United States Navy on July 8, 1943, shortly after graduating from high school, and served until June 11 of the next year.

Career
He was selected to attend the U.S. Naval Academy in the midst of World War II, and because of the ongoing war he and his classmates were placed in an accelerated three-year program. Upon graduating on June 6, 1947, he was commissioned a second lieutenant in the Marine Corps. He attended The Basic School at Quantico, Virginia, after which he became a platoon commander in the Platoon Leaders Class Training Regiment.

In 1948, López went to China, where he served as a mortar section commander and later as a rifle platoon commander at Tsingtao and Shanghai. On his return from China he was assigned to Camp Pendleton, California. He was serving there when, shortly after the outbreak of the Korean War, he volunteered for duty as an infantry officer in Korea. He was promoted to the rank of first lieutenant on June 16, 1950.

Korean War – Medal of Honor action

In Korea, Lt. López served as a platoon commander in A Company, 1st Battalion, 5th Marines, 1st Marine Division (Reinforced). On September 15, 1950, he took part in the amphibious invasion of Inchon. After landing on the beach, he was captured in an iconic photograph by Marguerite Higgins as he led his men over a seawall. Moments later, while preparing to throw a hand grenade into a North Korean bunker, he was struck by automatic weapons fire in the chest and right shoulder, causing him to drop the activated device. Although seriously wounded, Lt. López crawled toward the grenade and unable to throw it because of his injuries, pulled it under his body to shield others from the blast. He was killed in the resulting explosion and was posthumously awarded the Medal of Honor. Secretary of the Navy Dan A. Kimball presented the medal to Lopez's parents during a ceremony in Washington, D.C., on August 30, 1951.

News of his death spread quickly among fellow Marines on the battlefronts. A Scripps-Howard war correspondent, Jerry Thorp, said in a news story on López's deed that he "died with the courage that makes men great."

Medal of Honor

Lopez's official Medal of Honor citation reads:

López was buried at the Centro Asturiano Memorial Park Cemetery in Tampa, Florida.

Awards and decorations

In addition to the Medal of Honor, López's decorations include the Purple Heart, Presidential Unit Citation with one bronze star, World War II Victory Medal, China Service Medal, National Defense Service Medal, Korean Service Medal with two bronze stars and the United Nations Service Medal.

Legacy
Several structures have been named in López's honor, including a state nursing home and a school in Seffner, Florida. A Korean War memorial at the Ed Radice Sports Complex in Tampa was opened on November 11, 2007, and dedicated to Lopez. The memorial features a rock from the beach at Incheon. A public swimming pool across from Macfarlane Park in West Tampa is named for him. In Bancroft Hall, the U.S. Naval Academy dormitory, a room is dedicated to him (Room No. 3021), with a display including his photo and a bronze plaque of his Medal of Honor citation. There is also the Baldomero Lopez State Veteran' nursing home in Land O'Lakes FL at 6919 Parkway Blvd.

López's Medal of Honor remains in the possession of his extended family.

See also

List of Korean War Medal of Honor recipients
List of Hispanic Medal of Honor recipients
Hispanics in the United States Marine Corps
Hispanics in the United States Naval Academy

References

External links

1925 births
1950 deaths
American people of Asturian descent
People from Tampa, Florida
United States Naval Academy alumni
United States Marine Corps officers
United States Navy sailors
American military personnel killed in the Korean War
United States Marine Corps Medal of Honor recipients
Korean War recipients of the Medal of Honor
Deaths by hand grenade
United States Marine Corps personnel of the Korean War
United States Navy personnel of World War II